The 55th government of Turkey (30 June 1997 – 11 January 1999) was a coalition government led by Mesut Yılmaz of Motherland Party (ANAP). Coalition partners with Motherland Party were Democratic Left Party (DSP) and Democrat Turkey Party (DTP). The government was nicknamed Anasol-D, where "Ana" refers to ANAP, sol (left) refers to DSP, and D refers to DTP.

Background 
After the collapse of the 54th government, 55th government was formed by ANAP and DSP, which were the opposition parties during the 54th government. DTP, which was founded by a group of MPs exiting DYP, also joined the coalition. Although they still could not form a majority, Republican People's Party (CHP) promised to support the coalition without participating in the government.

The government
In the list below, the serving period of cabinet members who served only a part of the cabinet's lifespan are shown in the column "Notes".

Aftermath
The cabinet collapsed on 11 January 1999, as a result of the Türkbank scandal in 1998, which involved relationships between the government, the private sector and organized crime. CHP decided to end its support after the scandal.

References

Cabinets established in 1997
Cabinets disestablished in 1999
Cabinets of Turkey
Coalition governments of Turkey
Members of the 55th government of Turkey
Motherland Party (Turkey)
1997 establishments in Turkey
1999 disestablishments in Turkey